Brecc Evans (born September 6, 1999) is an American soccer player who plays as a defender for USL League One side Northern Colorado Hailstorm.

Career

Professional
In February 2019, Evans signed a two-year deal with North Texas SC ahead of their inaugural season after just one year at Cal Poly. Preceding the inaugural USL League One season, Evans was named captain of the young North Texas SC squad. He made his league debut for the club on March 30, 2019, playing all ninety minutes of a 3-2 home victory over the Chattanooga Red Wolves. In total, Evans made 22 appearances for North Texas SC, leading the team to a regular season championship and the first seed in the USL League One playoffs.

On November 30, 2020, Evans was released by North Texas.

Evans signed with USL Championship side Memphis 901 on March 24, 2021.

On January 6, 2022, Evans became the fourth-ever player announced by USL League One expansion team Northern Colorado Hailstorm FC.

References

External links
 
 Profile at Cal Poly Athletics

1999 births
Living people
American soccer players
Association football defenders
Cal Poly Mustangs men's soccer players
North Texas SC players
Soccer players from Santa Monica, California
USL League One players
USL Championship players
Austin Bold FC players
Memphis 901 FC players
Northern Colorado Hailstorm FC players